Turtledove or turtle dove may refer to:

Fauna
Various bird species, especially of the genus Streptopelia in the family Columbidae (doves and pigeons):
European turtle dove (Streptopelia turtur)
Oriental turtle dove (Streptopelia orientalis)
Dusky turtle dove (Streptopelia lugens)
Adamawa turtle dove (Streptopelia hypopyrrha)
Mourning dove (Zenaida macroura)

People
 Harry Turtledove (born 1949), historian and author who writes historical fiction, science fiction, and fantasy novels

Places
Turtle Dove Shoal, a rocky shoal in the Indian Ocean
Turtledove Cay, United States Virgin Islands, a small islet, located 100 yards north of Saba Island in the United States Virgin Islands

Business
Adidas Yeezy 350 Turtle Dove, a type of shoe in the Adidas Yeezy range
Turtledove Clemens, a  marketing communications agency in Portland, Oregon, USA

Literature and film
The turtle-dove's necklace, an 11th-century Arabic book by Ibn Hazm (also called The Ring of the Dove)
"The Turtle Dove", an 18th-century English folk ballad (also called "Fare Thee Well")
Turtledove General Delivery (Postlagernd Turteltaube), a 1952 West German comedy film

Jewish surnames
Yiddish-language surnames